The following are some of the most notable Gaelic footballers.  For a complete list see :Category:Gaelic footballers and :Category:Gaelic football managers.

Team of the Millennium
This was a team chosen in 1999 by a panel of GAA past presidents and journalists. The goal was to single out the best ever 15 players who had played the game in their respective positions, since the foundation of the GAA in 1884 up to the Millennium year, 2000. Naturally many of the selections were hotly debated by fans around the country.

Vodafone Footballer of the Year

See also
 List of All-Ireland Senior Football Championship winning captains

References